Miguel Maria de Sá Pais do Amaral, 8th Count of Anadia , 4th Count of Alferrarede, KHDSMOM, commonly known as Miguel Amaral (born 31 July 1954) is a Portuguese aristocrat, businessman and amateur racing driver.

Family
Miguel Amaral, born in Lisbon, Portugal, is the only child of Manuel José Maria de Sá Pais do Amaral, 7th Count of Anadia and Dona Maria Mafalda de Figueiredo Cabral da Câmara, of the Counts of Belmonte.

He married Maria da Luz Lagos do Amaral Cabral at Estoril on 5 November 1983. Maria was the daughter of Joaquim Emílio do Amaral Cabral, a lawyer, and Maria Elisabeth da Silva Lagos. Maria and Miguel had two daughters: Maria da Assunção de Sá Pais do Amaral, born at São Domingos de Benfica, Lisbon, on 29 December 1987, and Carolina Rita de Sá Pais do Amaral, born at São Domingos de Benfica, Lisbon, on 23 January 1991. The couple separated in 2010.

Career

Personal career

A mechanical engineer graduate with an MBA from INSEAD, Amaral was the former majority owner of the Media Capital group, a conglomerate that owns the TVI TV channel and several radio stations, including Rádio Comercial and Rádio Clube Português in Portugal. He sold a majority stake in the group to PRISA in 2005.

His current business interests are concentrated in Quifel Group, via 3 sub-holdings:  a) Quifel Natural Resources; b) AHS Investimentos; c) Partgris. Through these investment vehicles, Miguel Pais do Amaral has relevant stakes in companies such as Norwind, Campo Largo Patrimonial, Novabase, Casa da Anadia and others. The majority of his investments are concentrated in Portugal and Brazil, in renewable energy and property markets.

Racing career
He began racing in the Portuguese Cross-Country Rally Championship, as well as in the Portuguese Classic Touring Car Championship. In 2001, he teamed up with Pedro Couceiro to drive in the Spanish GT Championship before the two joined ASM Team. Later, he teamed up with Miguel de Castro driving a Porsche 997 GT3 RSR and in 2009 he won the Trofeu Iberico de GT.

In 2006. Amaral purchased a Lola B05/40 Le Mans prototype, formerly run by Chamberlain-Synergy Motorsports in the Le Mans Series. After one win under the Chamberlain name, the team scored two more victories as ASM, but this prevented Amaral and his co-drivers Miguel Angel de Castro and Angel Burgueño from winning their class. Amaral and ASM Team continued to run their Lola in the Le Mans Series in 2007 and 2008. In 2009, Amaral and Olivier Pla raced a Ginetta-Zytek GZ09S/2 and won the LMP2 championship.

24 Hours of Le Mans results

References

1954 births
24 Hours of Le Mans drivers
European Le Mans Series drivers
INSEAD alumni
International GT Open drivers
Living people
Drivex drivers
People from Lisbon
Portuguese businesspeople
Portuguese people of British descent
Portuguese people of Italian descent
Portuguese people of Swedish descent
Portuguese nobility
Portuguese racing drivers